Birmingham Terminal Railway  is a subsidiary of Watco, operator of several short-line railroad companies. It began operating in 2012 after acquiring the assets of the Birmingham Southern Railroad.

External links 

 

Alabama railroads
Economy of Birmingham, Alabama
Railway companies established in 2012
Switching and terminal railroads
Watco
American companies established in 2012